Giuseppe Mangiarotti (27 May 1883 – 24 October 1970) was an Italian fencer. He competed in the individual and team épée events at the 1908 Summer Olympics. His sons Dario, Mario and Edoardo were also fencers.

References

External links
 

1883 births
1970 deaths
Italian male fencers
Olympic fencers of Italy
Fencers at the 1908 Summer Olympics
Sportspeople from the Province of Pavia
Mangiarotti family